Nomadi 40 is a double album by Nomadi. Their twenty-eighth album, it celebrates the fortieth year of their musical career. Nomadi 40 contains a mix of old and new songs. It was certified gold from presales, and was at the top of the charts for 15 weeks.

The last track of the second disc, Come Potete Giudicar, is the version recorded in 1992 by Augustus Daolio, Beppe Carletti, Dante Pergreffi, Cico Falzone and Daniele Campani on the album Ma Noi No.

Personnel
 Beppe Carletti: Keyboards
 Cico Falzone: Guitar
 Daniele Campani: Drums
 Danilo Sacco: Voice and Guitar
 Massimo Vecchi: Bass and Voice
 Sergio Reggioli: Percussion and Violin

Track listing
  Disc 1 
 Noi non ci saremo   (3' 05")
 Gordon   (4' 18")
 Tutto a posto   (4' 18")
 Gli aironi neri   (4' 31")
 Il vento del nord   (4' 51")
 L'uomo di Monaco   (4' 15")
 Il fiore nero   (3' 19")
 I miei anni   (4' 45")
 Un pugno di sabbia   (4' 37")
 Per fare un uomo   (3' 33")
 Canzone per un'amica   (4' 19")
 Lontano   (4' 29")
 Un giorno insieme   (3' 58")
 Il vecchio e il bambino   (4' 36")
 L'angelo caduto   (4' 19")
 Io vagabondo   (3' 54")
 Voglio ridere   (4' 23")
 E di notte   (4' 21") 
  Disc 2 
 Io voglio vivere   (4' 58") 
 La libertà di volare   (4' 11")
 La vita che seduce   (4' 28")
 Una storia da raccontare   (3' 19")
 Auschwitz   (6' 00")
 Naracauli   (5' 06")
 Sangue al cuore   (4' 34")
 Le strade   (4' 41")
 Né gioia né dolore   (4' 49")
 Il nome che non hai   (4' 34")
 Ho difeso il mio amore   (4' 29")
 Dio è morto   (2' 49")
 Ti lascio una parola (Goodbye)   (4' 31")
 Vivo forte   (7' 25")
 Senza discutere   (3' 33")
 Come potete giudicar   (3' 27")

2003 albums
Nomadi albums
Italian-language albums
Compagnia Generale del Disco albums